Come Dine with Me Canada is a Canadian reality television series; it is adapted from the British programme Come Dine with Me, and produced by Proper Television. The show debuted November 1, 2010 on the W Network. The show generally brings five amateur chefs competing against each other hosting a dinner party for the other contestants. Each competitor then rates the host's performance, with the winner winning a $1,000 cash prize on Fridays; the winner is announced by Friday's dinner party host. An element of comedy is added to the show through comedian Jamie Carr, who provides a dry and "Canadian sarcastic" narration.

Season 1

Season 2

Season 3

Season 4

References

External links
 https://web.archive.org/web/20111120190857/http://www.wnetwork.com/shows/comedinewithmecanada.aspx
 Come Dine with Me Canada at IMDb

2010s Canadian reality television series
2010 Canadian television series debuts
2014 Canadian television series endings
Television series by Proper Television
Come Dine With Me
Canadian television series based on British television series
Television shows filmed in Toronto
W Network original programming